Martin Gethin (born 16 November 1983) is a British former professional boxer who competed from 2004 to 2017. He held the British lightweight title from 2013 to 2014.

Early professional career
Gethin made his debut in November 2004 beating journeyman Kristian Laight stopping him in the 4th round.  In his 10th fight he fought for the vacant Midlands Area lightweight title beating Craig Johnson on points over 10 rounds.  An exciting fighter he received a great opportunity just two fights later to fight in Las Vegas at the MGM Grand.  He beat Fabian Luque, who had a record of 21-5, and stopped him in the 4th round in what was his best win to date.  On returning to the UK, Gethin trod water beating Carl Allen and Ali Wyatt until the opportunity arose for him to fight the unbeaten Nadeem Siddique.  He won the fight in a potential fight of the year and set himself up for a shot at the English title.

English champion and challenger
In September 2008 Gethin fought touted prospect John Fewkes for the vacant English lightweight title and forced the referee to wave it off in the 4th round.  Fewkes came into the contest with a 17-0 record and with wins over Scott Haywood and Craig Watson on his record but had only fought once in the year and was also having problems making the weight.  As it transpired he failed to make the weight for the contest meaning that even if he won he would not have lifted the title.  Gethin took full advantage and dominated from the 3rd round securing a big upset win.  Gethin's first defence ended in disappointment however when he was defeated by Stoke's Scott Lawton at Nottingham's Trent FM Arena on 6 December 2008.  In March 2009 Gethin tried to shake off the disappointment of defeat by taking part in an eliminator for the British title, this time meeting Liverpool's John Watson at the city's Echo Arena.  He was to lose for the second time despite putting his opponent down in the last round he'd left it too late and lost on points.

Gethin suffered his third defeat in a row when on 18 May 2009 he lost to journeyman Chris Long at the Holiday Inn in Birmingham, losing on points after being put down by Long in the last round.  A victory the following month against another journeyman boxer, Jason Nesbitt, put Gethin back on winning ways before on 15 January 2010 he got the opportunity to once more fight for the English title.  The fight, at the leisure centre in Altrincham, resulted in a 10-round points victory over challenger Graeme Higginson to become a two time holder of the title.

References

1983 births
Living people
English male boxers
Lightweight boxers
Sportspeople from Walsall